Abimelech (also spelled Abimelek or Avimelech) was the generic name given to all Philistine kings in the Hebrew Bible from the time of Abraham through King David. In the Book of Judges, Abimelech, son of Gideon, of the Tribe of Manasseh, is proclaimed king of Shechem after the death of his father.

Etymology
The name or title Abimelech is formed from Hebrew words for "father" and "king," and may be interpreted in a variety of ways, including "Father-King", "My father is king," or "Father of a king." In the Pentateuch, it is used as a title for kings in the land of Canaan.

At the time of the Amarna tablets (mid-14th century BC), there was an Egyptian governor of Tyre similarly named Abimilki,

Abimelech of Gerar

Abimelech was most prominently the name of a polytheistic king of Gerar who is mentioned in two of the three wife–sister narratives in Genesis, in connection with both Abraham and Isaac.

King Abimelech of Gerar also appears in an extra-biblical tradition recounted in texts such as the Kitab al-Magall, the Cave of Treasures and the Conflict of Adam and Eve with Satan, as one of 12 regional kings in Abraham's time said to have built the city of Jerusalem for Melchizedek.

Abimelech Son of Jerubbaal

The Book of Judges mentions Abimelech, son of judge Gideon (also known as Jerubbaal). According to the biblical narrative, Abimelech was an extremely conniving and evil person. He persuaded his mother's brothers to encourage the people of Shechem to back him in a plot to overthrow his family rule and make him sole ruler. 

After slaying all but one of his seventy brothers, Abimelech was crowned king. The brother who escaped, Jotham youngest son of Jerrubaal, made a pronouncement against Abimelech and those who had crowned him.
The curse was that if they had not dealt righteously with the family of Jerrubaal, then fire would come against Abimelech from the people of Shechem and fire would come out of Abimelech against the people who had backed him in this bloody coup.
 
After Abimelech ruled for three years, the pronouncement came through. The people of Shechem set robbers to lie in wait of any goods or money headed to Abimelech and steal everything.
Then Gaal Son of Ebed went to Shechem and drunkenly bragged that he would remove Abimelech from the throne. Zebul, ruler of Shechem, sent word to Abimelech along with a battle strategy. Once Zebul taunted Gaal into fighting Abimelech, he shut Gaal and his brethren out of the city. 

Abimelech then slew the field workers that came out of the city of Shechem the next day. When he heard that the people of Shechem had locked themselves in a strong tower, he and his men set fire to it, killing about a thousand men and women.

After this, Abimelech went to Thebez and camped against it. When he went close to the tower in Thebez to set it on fire, a woman dropped an upper millstone on Abimelech's head.  He did not want to be known as having been killed by a woman, so he asked his armour bearer to run him through with a sword. His place of death is cited as being Thebez.

Other people with this name
Apart from the king (or kings) of Gerar, the Bible also records this name for:
The father of Abiathar, and high priest in the time of David. In the parallel passage, the name is given as Ahimelech; most authorities consider this the more correct reading.
The king of Gath better known as Achish, referred to as Abimelech or Achimelech in the title of Psalm 34.
The husband of Naomi, and father of Mahlon and Chilion who leaves Bethlehem and dies in the land of Moab, in the Hebrew, his name is given as Elimelek, which is likely the correct reading.
Other literary references include:
Abimélech, Satrap of Gaza is a character baritone in Camille Saint-Saëns' Samson and Delilah.

See also
Abimelech (oratorio)
Wife–sister narratives in the Book of Genesis

References

Philistines
Philistine kings
Torah monarchs
Set index articles on Hebrew Bible people
Vayeira